Fundición Ventanas is a copper smelter plant in Quintero, Valparaíso Region, Chile. It is owned by Codelco. The plant produces a significant amount of sulfuric acid. Its emissions of sulfur dioxide, an atmospheric contaminant, is within the limits allowed by Chilean environmental law but below international standards. According to Codelco's CEO André Sougarret one of the problems of Fundición Ventanas is that on a third of the year's days meteorological "condictions are adverse for the dispersal" of its gas emissions.

In June 2022 the government of Chile announced that a closure process for the plant was to begin. Its workers have protested against the closure. There is no consensus on where to build a new larger and more modern plant in replacement. Antofagasta Region or Atacama Region has been proposed by Chilean industry scholars as viable replacements. Others have argued for keeping smelting in Valparaíso Region given the existence of nearby mines. While some argue the replacement plant should be near the coast, inland Chuquicamata and El Salvador have also been proposed as alternatives. The president of the National Mining Society (Sonami), Diego Hernández, estimates the construction period for a new smelter plant to be 5 to 7 years.

See also
Pollution in Quintero and Puchuncaví

References

Buildings and structures in Valparaíso Region
Ventanas
Mining in Chile